Prunus rigida, is a species of shrub or tree in the family Rosaceae. It is native to Peru and Bolivia.

References

External links 

Photo of herbarium specimen at Missouri Botanical Garden

rigida
Flora of South America
Plants described in 1915
Trees of Peru
Trees of Bolivia